Rmah   (also Rimah) is a  town in Akkar Governorate, Lebanon, close to the border with Syria.

The population in Rmah is mostly Greek Orthodox Christian or Sunni Muslim.

History
In 1838, Eli Smith noted  the village as 'Rummah,  whose inhabitants were Greek Orthodox Christian or Alawites, located east of esh-Sheikh Mohammed.

References

Bibliography

External links
Rmah, Localiban 

Populated places in Akkar District
Sunni Muslim communities in Lebanon
Eastern Orthodox Christian communities in Lebanon